This is the discography of Clipse, an American hip hop duo consisting of rappers Pusha T and No Malice.

Albums

Studio albums

Mixtapes

Other albums

Singles

As lead artist

As featured artist

Other charted songs

Guest appearances

See also 
 No Malice discography
 Pusha T discography

References

Hip hop discographies
Discographies of American artists